The Downtown Primary School, Elementary Arts Educational Institution and Logopedical Institute (Hungarian: Belvárosi Általános Iskola, Alapfokú Művészetoktatási Intézmény és Logopédiai Intézet, informally referred to as Kálvin or Belvárosi) is a state school in Hungary, located in Csongrád county, in the city of Makó on Kálvin square. The Latin motto of the school is "Docendo discimus", which means "We learn by the way of teaching" (Hungarian: Tanítva tanulunk). The ancestor of the school was founded by István Szegedi Kis in 1545. The Protestant church used the school to provide the congregations with pastors and teachers during the Ottoman invasion of Hungary. In 1686 the Ottomans burned down the city, including the school. It was rebuilt in 1713 as a state school. In 1812 it became the "Great School" (Hungarian: Nagy Oskola).

During the Hungarian Soviet Republic the school's name was Béla Kun Primary School. After the demise of the Soviet Republic, the school changed its name back to Kálvin Street Primary School, which was the name until the school merged with Béla Bartók School.

Coat of arms 

One part of the coat imagine the school by a coatquarter the "Owl castle". The owl however mean wisdom and knowledge too. The three lyre symbolize the arts education. The three shell mean mathematics, and the liability of the school that they utilize the gifts (white pearl) of its students. In the circle of permission stand a compass, in the meaning of life and knowledge, the shower of the right way. The torch is the fire's reunion force, and the attribute of wisdom. The compass and the torch imply the theses of Comenius, the importance of the quality insurance. The coat's red and blue colour is because of the city Makó's flagcolours.

Parts of the school

Kálvin building 

The greatest unit of the school is the building complex on Calvin square  next to the Calvinist church. A mixed complex, what stand from the Owlcastle to the modern new building, and contain various building styles. The oldest unit is on the name Owl Castle (Bagolyvár), Makó's oldest tiered building. It was built in Early-Classicism style about 180 years before, with cellar and attic. There is teaching in that nowadays too, on the first floor are the foreign language classrooms (English, German) and the religious study-circles and other afternoon abilities. On the ground floor is the student and teacher dining hall and the kitchen.

The old building is about 80 years old, the old Bethlen Internate's building make place for the mathematic, informatic, Hungarian classrooms, the library, the teacher's room, and the media-singing classroom. In the year of 2006 this classroom was modernised by a beamer, movie projector to make it the level of other classrooms. The newest unit, the new building was built in 1982. Here is the education of lower classes, and on the ground are the crafts classrooms, the nowadays don't used furnace and the cubicles. The Kálvin Street complex has two (small and large) gyms, a sports field, a running field that is covered with cinder, and two jumpingfield that were in 2005 rebuilt with new bricks.

Bartók building 

In 1997 this school become the part of the Downtown Primary School, Elementary Arts Educational Institution and Logopedical Institute, this give the end "Elementary Arts Educational Institution". It was founded in 1880 as a civilian girl primary school. After the fall of that it took the name Szeged Street Primary School. That was an important point, when in 1958 Dénes Bolaman's wife music teacher founded the first music class, what characterize the school nowadays too. By the way of this can it be the second largest complex of the Downtown Primary School Elementary Arts Educational Institution and Logopedical Institute.

It stand from the main building, what wear on itself the classicism, where is the forenoon education. The library, classrooms, chorus classroom and other rooms can be found here. In the other building is the musical instrument classrooms. One-one classroom is linked with a corridor and the dining room make this second part of the Bartok Building. Here can be found a very large palette of the musical instruments classrooms, and the room of orchestra. This part has a gym, a football field, and a ship-shaped sand pit. The Bartók building makes place for the cultural life and celebrating in the school.

Member institutes 

In 2005 many schools in the vicinity became under this school's "defender wings". With Ferencszállás, Királyhegyes and Klárafalva villages' education instituted, we became one of the largest school in the region. Because of this the students from this villages get from the light of the Downtown Primary School, Elementary Arts Educational Institution and Logopedical Institute too.

Notable alumni 

 Miklós Szirbik
 István Tömörkény
 Ferenc Erdei

Gallery

External links 

 The school's homepages
 The city of Makó educational page
 The page vendégváró from the Owl Castle
 Classicism in Makó

Schools in Hungary
Csongrád-Csanád County